Gaylordsville is a village in the northwest corner of the town of New Milford, Litchfield County, Connecticut, United States. It was listed as a census-designated place (CDP) prior to the 2020 census.

History
The early history of Gaylordsville is closely connected to the Gaylord family, early settlers in New England. In 1630 William Gaylord arrived in Dorchester, Massachusetts on the ship "Mary and John" along with his wife and five sons. A deacon in the puritan church, he was involved in the affairs of the colony, signing land grants and serving on the first jury in the colony. He later settled in East Windsor, Connecticut. His great-grandson, Ensign William Gaylord, moved to Woodbury in 1706 and married Joanna, the daughter of Captain John Minor. Joanna's sister, Grace, married Samuel Grant, and was an ancestor of President Grant.

In 1712, the Gaylord couple came to New Milford, Connecticut, which had been settled only five years previously. Their house stood on the corner of Main and Elm Streets. For a time he kept a tavern there in addition to doing his regular work as a surveyor. He did a lot of surveying for the State, laying out town boundary lines, and it was, no doubt, on one of these surveying trips that he became impressed with the large areas of level land several miles north of the New Milford village, just north of the straits on the Housatonic River. He began taking title to parcels of it, and soon owned a large part of the valley. To ensure the good will of the Native Americans living in the area, he also bought it from them, giving, according to legend, a horse, a mule, and a two-wheeled cart.

In 1722, a highway was laid out 'by marked trees' north from New Milford to the brook called Whemiseck. The blazed trail ran through Squash Hallow, past the straits, and over Cedar Hill. Mr. Gaylord was probably the surveyor who laid out this road, and probably put it over Cedar Hill so it would not cut into the level areas that were to become his fields.

In 1725, Mr. Gaylord travelled this trail from New Milford and built a log cabin west of the Housatonic just north of the straits. He lived in this cabin three years while he was clearing land, cutting timbers, and building his frame house, which he built in 1728. The following year his oldest son, Aaron, built a house about a quarter of a mile south of his father's, and on the west side of the valley.

During this time the Gaylord family became good friends with their Indian neighbors, teaching them better methods of agriculture, and dickering with them for furs they could use. The family consisted of Mr. and Mrs. Gaylord, Aaron, Joanna, Ruth, Benjamin, and Mary. Benjamin remained at his father's home, and eventually took over the homestead. He married Tryal Morehouse on October 23, 1745.

William Gaylord died October 25, 1743, at the age of 73. His grave, and that of Mrs. Gaylord were the first ones in a cemetery that had been laid out about half a mile south of the Gaylord home.

Geography
Gaylordsville is located at geographical coordinates 41° 38′ 47" North, 73° 29′ 5" West (41.646469, -73.484673).

Gaylordsville is located in the northwest corner of New Milford. It is part of the valley known to the Native Americans as the Wheniuck or Red Plumb Plain. On the east the boundary is Quanuctnic or Long Mountain, but it has never been decided whether it should be at the foot of the mountain or somewhere up on top. The southern boundary is also vague, usually considered to be an imaginary line leaving the Housatonic River somewhere south of the Tory Cave and extending across Squash Hollow. The Sherman town line forms the western boundary, although several homes in Sherman are usually considered to be part of the Gaylordsville community.

The Housatonic River runs through the center of the village and is joined by the Wimisink, Womunshenuck, Naromiyocknowhusunkatankshunk (Morrissey), and Squash Hollow brooks. The south end of the valley is divided into two narrow valleys by Straits Mountain or Pauguiack. The north end of this overlooks the village and is called "the Pinnacle". The area usually considered to be Gaylordsville is about four miles long and one mile wide.

Historical sites
Brown's Forge, a blacksmith shop. 1870
The Little Red Schoolhouse 1740 - 1967. The last operating one-room schoolhouse in Connecticut.  Also known as the Gaylord School, it was one of New Milford's primary schools for 227 years.
Merwinsville Hotel 1843

Notable people
 Katharine Anthony, biographer
 Elisabeth Irwin, founder of the Little Red School House in New York City
 Florence Maybrick, convicted murderer
 Isaac Stern, violinist
 Nan Watson, artist

Gallery

References

External links

 Gaylordsville, CT
 Gaylordsville Volunteer Fire Department
 Gaylordsville Historical Society
 Merwinsville Hotel Restoration
 Town of New Milford (official site)
 Greater New Milford Chamber of Commerce

New Milford, Connecticut
Villages in Litchfield County, Connecticut
Villages in Connecticut
Census-designated places in Litchfield County, Connecticut
Census-designated places in Connecticut